Ruy Santos Scarpino (17 February 1962 – 3 March 2021) was a Brazilian football manager.

Personal life
Scarpino was born in Vitória. Amid the COVID-19 pandemic in Brazil, he was hospitalised with COVID-19 on 28 February 2021 and died on 3 March in Manaus.

Honours
Ituano
 Campeonato Brasileiro Série C: 2003
 Campeonato Paulista: 2002

Moto Club
 Campeonato Maranhense: 2004, 2016

Imperatriz
 Campeonato Maranhense: 2019

Notes

External links
 

1962 births
2021 deaths
Association football goalkeepers
People from Vitória, Espírito Santo
Brazilian football managers
Brazilian footballers
Campeonato Brasileiro Série B managers
Campeonato Brasileiro Série C managers
Campeonato Brasileiro Série D managers
Moto Club de São Luís managers
Ituano FC managers
Goiânia Esporte Clube managers
Esporte Clube Santo André managers
Rio Branco Esporte Clube managers
Grêmio Barueri Futebol managers
América Futebol Clube (RN) managers
Esporte Clube Noroeste managers
Clube Atlético Linense managers
Ceará Sporting Club managers
Red Bull Brasil managers
São José Esporte Clube managers
Clube Atlético Sorocaba managers
Cuiabá Esporte Clube managers
Associação Atlética de Altos managers
Maranhão Atlético Clube managers
Sertãozinho Futebol Clube managers
Campinense Clube managers
Sociedade Imperatriz de Desportos managers
Deaths from the COVID-19 pandemic in Amazonas (Brazilian state)
Sportspeople from Espírito Santo
Amazonas Futebol Clube managers